Crossovers in video games occur when otherwise separated  fictional characters, stories, settings, universes, or media in a video game meet and interact with each other. These may exist as a gimmick if two separate games in question are developed by the same company. Otherwise, they may exist as a gag from a rival company.

The following is a list of games in which crossovers appear in either the form of a cameo of any kind, a guest character, or the theme of "crossover" in general in a video game itself. Many crossover games include third-party companies.

First and second-party crossovers
This list includes crossovers and cameos of characters from video games owned by one company and close affiliates. These can range from a character simply appearing as a playable character or boss in the game, as a special guest character, or a major crossover where two or more franchises encounter.

Third-party crossovers
This list includes video games that have crossovers from two or more separate companies.

Comic book/video game crossovers
Video games that have comic book franchise characters encountering or facing off against other comic book franchise characters or third-party video game characters in a crossover video game or as a guest character in a third-party video game include:

{| class="wikitable sortable" style="font-size: 90%"
|+
! scope="col" style="width: 275px;" |Video game
! scope="col" style="width: 115px;" |Series
! scope="col" style="width: 105px;" |Publisher
!Featuring
|-
|Soulcalibur II
|SoulCalibur
| rowspan="2" |Bandai Namco
|Spawn of Image Comics in the Xbox and HD versions
|-
|Tekken 7
|Tekken
|Negan from Image Comics' The Walking Dead appears as a DLC character in the console versions
|-
|Marvel Super Heroes
|
| rowspan="9" |Capcom
|Darkstalkers Anita
|-
|X-Men: Children of the Atom|
|Akuma from Street Fighter
|-
|X-Men vs. Street Fighter| rowspan="7" |Marvel vs. Capcom| rowspan="7" |Characters from various Capcom and Marvel Comics series
|-
|Marvel Super Heroes vs. Street Fighter|-
|Marvel vs. Capcom: Clash of Super Heroes|-
|Marvel vs. Capcom 2: New Age of Heroes|-
|Marvel vs. Capcom 3: Fate of Two Worlds|-
|Ultimate Marvel vs. Capcom 3|-
|Marvel vs. Capcom: Infinite|-
|Disney Infinity: Marvel Super Heroes|Disney Infinity|Disney Interactive Studios
|
|-
|Fortnite|
|Epic Games
|Weapons and gear from Marvel Comics and DC Comics
|-
|Iron Man and X-O Manowar in Heavy Metal|
|
|Marvel's Iron Man and Valiant's X-O Manowar
|-
|Revenge of Shinobi|
|
|Batman and Spider-Man are bosses
|-
|Teenage Mutant Ninja Turtles: Smash-Up|Teenage Mutant Ninja Turtles
|
|Ubisoft's Rabbids on the Wii version
|-
|Tony Hawk's Pro Skater 5|Tony Hawk's
|
|The Teenage Mutant Ninja Turtles appear as playable characters. Various Marvel Comics characters appear throughout the series.
|-
|Injustice: Gods Among Us| rowspan="2" |Injustice
| rowspan="5" |Warner Bros. Interactive Entertainment
|Scorpion from Mortal Kombat
|-
|Injustice 2|Hellboy, Teenage Mutant Ninja Turtles, and Raiden and Sub-Zero from Mortal Kombat
|-
|Mortal Kombat vs. DC Universe| rowspan="2" |Mortal Kombat
|A major crossover game that features characters from Mortal Kombat and DC Comics superheroes.
|-
|Mortal Kombat 11|DC Comics' Joker and Image Comic's Spawn are a part of DLC Kombat Pack 1. 
Bonus costumes based on other Harley Quinn for Cassie Cage, Killer Croc for Baraka, Catwoman for Kitana, Darkseid for Geras, The Batman Who Laughs for Noob Saibot, and a Hellspawn for Jacqui Briggs are also available through the Kombat Pack
|-
|Scribblenauts Unmasked: A DC Comics Adventure|Scribblenauts
|
|}

Cartoon/video game crossovers
Video games that have cartoon franchise characters encountering or facing off against other cartoon franchise characters or video game characters in a crossover video game or as a guest character in a third-party video game include:

Cartoon Network:Cartoon Network: Battle Crashers (Adventure Time, The Amazing World of Gumball, Clarence, Regular Show, Steven Universe, and Uncle Grandpa)Cartoon Network: Block Party (Johnny Bravo, Ed, Edd n Eddy, Courage the Cowardly Dog, and Cow and Chicken)Cartoon Network: Formula Cartoon All-Stars (Mobile racing game featuring characters from Adventure Time, Regular Show, The Amazing World of Gumball, Steven Universe, Clarence, Uncle Grandpa, The Powerpuff Girls, Ben 10, The Marvelous Misadventures of Flapjack, Johnny Bravo, and Dexter's Laboratory)Cartoon Network: Punch Time Explosion (Fighting game in the style of Super Smash Bros. featuring characters from Johnny Bravo, Dexter's Laboratory, The Powerpuff Girls, Codename: Kids Next Door, The Grim Adventures of Billy & Mandy, Samurai Jack, Ben 10, Foster's Home for Imaginary Friends, Chowder, The Marvelous Misadventures of Flapjack, and Captain Planet and the Planeteers. Also, Space Ghost from Space Ghost Coast to Coast appears as the announcer and referee of the game, as well as the narrator of the story-mode)Cartoon Network Racing (Courage the Cowardly Dog, Cow and Chicken, Dexter's Laboratory, I Am Weasel, Johnny Bravo, and The Powerpuff Girls)Cartoon Network Speedway (Johnny Bravo, Ed, Edd n Eddy, Cow and Chicken, Courage the Cowardly Dog, and Sheep in the Big City)Cartoon Network Universe: FusionFall (Now-defunct free to play MMORPG featuring representation from multiple series including Dexter's Laboratory, Johnny Bravo, Cow and Chicken, The Powerpuff Girls, Ed, Edd n Eddy, Courage the Cowardly Dog, Time Squad, The Grim Adventures of Billy & Mandy, Codename: Kids Next Door, Samurai Jack, Megas XLR, Foster's Home for Imaginary Friends, The Life and Times of Juniper Lee, Ben 10, Camp Lazlo, My Gym Partner's A Monkey, Class of 3000, Chowder, The Marvelous Misadventures of Flapjack, The Secret Saturdays, Adventure Time, Regular Show, Generator Rex, The Amazing World of Gumball and Sym-Bionic Titan as well as TOM from the Toonami programming block and live-action series Unnatural History and Tower Prep. Also featured are programs with acquired syndication rights including Johnny Test and Total Drama)FusionFall Heroes (A spin-off to the main game released after its shutdown featuring playable characters from Dexter's Laboratory, Johnny Bravo, Ben 10, Adventure Time, Regular Show,, The Amazing World of Gumball and Johnny Test)TKO: Titanic Kungfubot Offensive (Fighting game featuring robot versions of characters from The Marvelous Misadventures of Flapjack, Chowder, Ben 10: Ultimate Alien, Adventure Time, Sym-Bionic Titan, The Secret Saturdays, and Generator Rex as well as programs with acquired syndication rights including Johnny Test and Total Drama)The Flintstones: The Rescue of Dino & Hoppy (the game's last stage takes place on the future as depicted on The Jetsons, including an appearance by George Jetson)Harvey Birdman: Attorney at Law (due to the very nature of the animated series it is based on, the game includes various Hanna-Barbera characters)
Nickelodeon (Characters from SpongeBob SquarePants, Jimmy Neutron, Planet Sheen, The Fairly OddParents, Danny Phantom, The Ren & Stimpy Show, CatDog, Rugrats, The Wild Thornberrys, Hey Arnold!, The Angry Beavers, Aaahh!!! Real Monsters, My Life as a Teenage Robot, Invader Zim, Rocko's Modern Life, Catscratch, El Tigre, All Grown Up!, Rocket Power, Tak and the Power of Juju, Avatar: The Last Airbender, Fanboy & Chum Chum, T.U.F.F. Puppy, Winx Club, Teenage Mutant Ninja Turtles, The Loud House, and Monkey Quest)Nickelodeon Kart Racers seriesNickelodeon Kart RacersNickelodeon Kart Racers 2: Grand PrixNickelodeon Kart Racers 3: Slime SpeedwayNickelodeon Party BlastNicktoons BasketballNicktoons: Freeze Frame FrenzyNicktoons MLBNicktoons NitroNicktoons RacingNicktoons Unite seriesNicktoons Unite!Nicktoons: Battle for Volcano IslandNicktoons: Attack of the ToybotsSpongeBob SquarePants featuring Nicktoons: Globs of DoomNicktoons Winners Cup RacingNickelodeon Super Brawl seriesNickelodeon All-Star BrawlThe Walt Disney Company:Club PenguinDance Dance Revolution Disney MixDance Dance Revolution Disney Channel Edition (similar concept but with various Disney Channel series instead)Disney Crossy Road (Disney characters in the style of Crossy Road)Disney Emoji BlitzDisney's Extreme Skate Adventure (characters from The Lion King, Tarzan, and Toy Story are playable skaters)Disney Friends (interact with Winnie the Pooh, Dory from Finding Nemo, Stitch, and Simba from The Lion King)Disney Heroes: Battle Mode (Mobile RPG featuring Wreck-It Ralph, Zootopia, and The Incredibles. Further updates have included Mickey Mouse, Toy Story, Pirates of the Caribbean, The Lion King, Aladdin, Alice in Wonderland, TRON: Legacy, Beauty and the Beast, Sleeping Beauty, Moana, Brave, Coco, Inside Out, WALL-E, DuckTales, Darkwing Duck, Hercules, Lilo & Stitch, Frozen, Monsters, Inc., Big Hero 6, Peter Pan, Kim Possible, The Muppets, The Emperor's New Groove, Gargoyles, Chip 'n Dale: Rescue Rangers, The Jungle Book, Mulan, Onward, Raya and the Last Dragon, Pocahontas, and The Nightmare Before Christmas)Disney Infinity series (characters from the many assets owned by The Walt Disney Company like the Disney original characters, the Pixar characters, the Marvel Comics super heroes and Lucasfilm's Star Wars)Disney Magical World and Disney Magical World 2Disney Tsum Tsum FestivalDisney Universe (levels and costumes based on Mickey Mouse, Aladdin, The Lion King, Peter Pan, Cinderella, Alice in Wonderland, Pirates of the Caribbean, Wall-E, Monsters Inc., The Little Mermaid, Lilo & Stitch, Finding Nemo, and Tron. Additional DLC packs include The Nightmare Before Christmas, Phineas and Ferb, and The Muppets)Epic Mickey: Power of Illusion (levels based on Aladdin, Peter Pan, The Little Mermaid, Snow White and the Seven Dwarfs, The Lion King, Alice in Wonderland, Beauty and the Beast, and Tangled. The main antagonist returns from Castle of Illusion starring Mickey Mouse, now in the form of Maleficent)Kinect Disneyland AdventuresKinect Rush: A Disney-Pixar AdventureKingdom Hearts series (various characters from Square Enix and Disney franchises):Kingdom HeartsKingdom Hearts: Chain of MemoriesKingdom Hearts IIKingdom Hearts CodedKingdom Hearts 358/2 DaysKingdom Hearts Birth By SleepKingdom Hearts 3D: Dream Drop DistanceKingdom Hearts χ / Kingdom Hearts: Unchained χ / Kingdom Hearts: Union XKingdom Hearts HD 2.8 Final Chapter PrologueKingdom Hearts 0.2: Birth by Sleep - A Fragmentary PassageKingdom Hearts χ Back CoverKingdom Hearts IIIKingdom Hearts: Melody of MemoryKingdom Hearts MobileMeteos: Disney Magic (Meteos and six franchises: Toy Story, The Nightmare Before Christmas, Lilo & Stitch, The Lion King, The Little Mermaid, and Pirates of the Caribbean)Toontown OnlineManga/anime crossovers
Video games that have manga franchise characters or anime franchise characters encountering or facing off against other manga or anime franchise characters in a crossover video game include:
 Another Century's Episode series Aquapazza: Aquaplus Dream Match: including Utawarerumono, Tears to Tiara, and To Heart.
Bandai Namco:Heroes Phantasia (crossover of Slayers, Sorcerous Stabber Orphen, Blood+, Rune Soldier, Read or Die, Sgt. Frog, My-HiME, Darker than Black and s-CRY-ed)Jump ComicsBattle Stadium D.O.N (Dragon Ball, One Piece, and Naruto)Dragon Ball Z: Budokai Tenkaichi 3 (Arale from Dr. Slump)Famicom Jump: Hero RetsudenFamicom Jump II: Saikyō no ShichininJ-Stars Victory VSJoJo's Bizarre Adventure: All-Star Battle (Ikuro Hashizawa from Baoh)Jump Super StarsJump Ultimate StarsJump ForceMajokko Daisakusen: Little Witching MischiefsPanic in Nakayoshi World (Sailor Moon, Chō Kuse ni Narisō, Goldfish Warning! and Kurumi to 7 Ninnokobitotachi)Queen's Gate: Spiral ChaosSoulcalibur IV (the character Angol Fear is said to be the cousin of Angol Mois from Sgt. Frog)Super Heroine ChronicleSuper Robot Wars series (features mecha from various anime and manga series)Tekken 3 (Gon from the eponymous manga)
Dengeki Bunko:Dengeki Bunko: Fighting ClimaxDengeki Gakuen RPG: Cross of Venus (crossover of Dengeki Bunko light novels)
 DreamMix TV World Fighters (various Takara, Hudson and Konami characters)Final Fantasy Brave Exvius (A special crossover event with Fullmetal Alchemist)Gran Turismo series (two cars from the Initial D manga—Takumi Fujiwara's Toyota AE86 and Mako Sato and Sayuki's Sileighty—are available throughout the series)
Koei Tecmo:Dead or Alive Paradise (Rio from Rio: Rainbow Gate)Dynasty Warriors: Gundam Magical Battle Arena Monster Hunter Tri (exclusive to Japan's version, some event weapons are based on anime and manga series from Kodansha, Shogakukan, and Shueisha)
 Nakayoshi All Stars – Mezase Gakuen IdolNintendo:
Donkey Konga seriesDonkey Konga (Theme songs from anime series Doraemon, Case Closed, and Hamtaro exclusive to the Japanese version)Donkey Konga 2 (Theme songs from anime series Naruto, Doraemon, Mobile Suit Gundam Seed, Bobobo-bo Bo-bobo, Heidi, Girl of the Alps, Mazinger Z, Chibi Maruko-chan, Futari wa Pretty Cure, and Kaiketsu Zorori are exclusive to the Japanese version)Donkey Konga 3 (Theme songs from anime series Dragon Ball Z, Naruto, Case Closed, Fullmetal Alchemist, Mobile Suit Gundam Seed, Atashin'chi, Touch, and Crayon Shin-chan are available)Super Mario Maker (A costume for Mario in the Super Mario Bros. theme based on Chitoge Kirisaki from Nisekoi)Nitroplus Blasterz: Heroines Infinite Duel SD Gundam G GenerationSega:Astro Boy: Omega Factor (several other characters created by Osamu Tezuka appears with important roles on the plot of the game, included Hosuke Sharaku from The Three-Eyed One, Black Jack from the series of the same name and Phoenix)Miracle Girls Festival (crossover of eleven anime shows: YuruYuri, Nyaruko: Crawling with Love, Vividred Operation, Kin-iro Mosaic, Arpeggio of Blue Steel, Tesagure! Bukatsu-mono, Wake Up, Girls!, Go! Go! 575, No-Rin, Engaged to the Unidentified and Is the Order a Rabbit?)
 Shounen Sunday x Shounen Magazine Nettou! Dream Nine Sunday vs Magazine: Shūketsu! Chōjō DaikessenSword Art Online: Memory Defrag and Sword Art Online: Integral Factor (A special crossover event featuring characters from Persona 5 Royal)
Tatsunoko Production:Tatsunoko FightTatsunoko vs. Capcom: Ultimate All-StarsYo-kai Watch: Wibble Wobble (Multiple characters from Case Closed, Magi: The Labyrinth of Magic, The Seven Deadly Sins, and GeGeGe no Kitarō appear as available Yo-kai)

Scrapped crossovers
These crossovers were planned during development, but were removed from the final product:Capcom Fighting All-StarsDead or Alive 4 (Master Chief from Halo was planned to be a guest character, but was replaced by Spartan-458, or Nicole)Disney Infinity (Kermit the Frog from The Muppets franchise and Ferb Fletcher from Phineas and Ferb were planned to be playable characters. Before cancelling future content, they had planned a playset and characters from Moana, and had planned Peter Pan, Spider-Gwen and Doctor Strange to be playable characters as well.)Fighting Vipers (Sonic the Hedgehog and Miles "Tails" Prower were planned to be playable characters. However, they are playable via hacking.)Injustice 2 (According to Ed Boon, Neo from The Matrix was almost included but the deal had fallen through.)Mario & Luigi: Superstar Saga (Samus Aran from Metroid, Link from The Legend of Zelda, Olimar from Pikmin, Fox McCloud from Star Fox, and a biker from Excitebike were meant to appear)Marvel: Ultimate Alliance (Link and Samus Aran were planned to be exclusive characters for the Wii version of the game)Marvel vs. Capcom 3: Fate of Two Worlds (Marvel's Blade, Doctor Octopus and Silver Surfer and Capcom's Tyrant from Resident Evil were planned to be playable characters. Other rejected characters were included in the Ultimate version of the game.)Mega Man Universe (Ryu from Street Fighter and Arthur from Ghosts 'n Goblins were planned before the game was cancelled)Mortal Kombat (2011) (Sweet Tooth from Twisted Metal was to be the PS3/Vita exclusive character)NBA Jam: Tournament Edition (Raiden, Reptile, & Sub-Zero from Mortal Kombat and King Kong were removed at the request of the NBA.)PlayStation All-Stars Battle Royale (Abe from Oddworld and Dart Feld from The Legend of Dragoon were planned to be playable characters.)Poker Night 2 (Marty McFly or Doc Brown from Back to the Future: The Game was going to have the last seat at the table, but the spot went to Sam from Sam and Max)Punch-Out (Wii) (Princess Peach from the Super Mario series and other Nintendo characters were planned. Mario was planned to return as the referee.)Sega All-Stars series:Sonic & Sega All-Stars Racing (Vyse from Skies of Arcadia, Segata Sanshiro, Bug from Bug! and Mario as a Wii-exclusive driver were all considered. ToeJam & Earl were planned to be playable characters. Gilius Thunderhead from Golden Axe was scrapped during development.)Sonic & All-Stars Racing Transformed (ToeJam & Earl, Ristar, Bayonetta, Vectorman, Segata Sanshiro, and Hatsune Miku were all in consideration due to fan demand.)Skylanders: SuperChargers (another Mario character, Kirby, and Fox McCloud from Star Fox were also in consideration as guest characters.)
Soulcalibur series:Soulcalibur II (Cloud Strife from Final Fantasy VII was planned to be the PlayStation 2 exclusive character)Soulcalibur III (Dante from Devil May Cry was planned)Soulcalibur V (Bayonetta was considered)Street Fighter X Tekken (exclusive characters for the Xbox 360 version were planned, but were cut for time)Super Smash Bros. series:Super Smash Bros. (Bowser from Super Mario, King Dedede from Kirby, Mewtwo from Pokémon, Falco Lombardi from Star Fox, and Marth from Fire Emblem)Super Smash Bros. Melee (the Balloon Fighter, the main character of Urban Champion, Bubbles from Clu Clu Land, an Excitebike rider, the Mach Rider, Ayumi Tachibana from Detective Club, Takamaru from The Mysterious Murasame Castle, Toad from Super Mario Bros., Lucas from Mother 3, Banjo and Kazooie, James Bond as he appears in GoldenEye 007, Solid Snake from Metal Gear, and Sonic the Hedgehog were in consideration to be playable characters.)Super Smash Bros. Brawl (Dixie Kong from Donkey Kong, Mewtwo from Pokémon, Roy from Fire Emblem, Dr. Mario, and Zelda as she appears in The Legend of Zelda: The Wind Waker were scrapped during development. The Miis, a villager from Animal Crossing, Blastoise from Pokémon, Pac-Man, and Geno from Super Mario RPG: Legend of the Seven Stars were in consideration.)Super Smash Bros. for Nintendo 3DS and Wii U (Ice Climbers and a character from Rhythm Heaven were scrapped during development. Alph from Pikmin 3 was meant to be his own character before becoming an alternate costume for Olimar in the final release. Heihachi Mishima from Tekken, Takamaru from The Mysterious Murasame Castle, and Chrom from Fire Emblem Awakening were in consideration.)Super Smash Bros. Ultimate (Alucard from Castlevania, Decidueye from Pokémon Sun and Moon, Slime and other additional Heroes from Dragon Quest, Ninjara from ARMS and Rex from Xenoblade Chronicles 2 were all considered to be playable.)Tatsunoko vs. Capcom: Ultimate All-Stars (Muteking, The Dashing Warrior, Komugi Nakahara from Nurse Witch Komugi, Arthur from Ghosts 'n Goblins, Ingrid from Capcom Fighting Evolution and Ace Attorney's Phoenix Wright and Franziska von Karma were scrapped)Tekken X Street FighterTokyo Mirage Sessions ♯FE''' (the game was originally envisioned as a crossover between Pokémon and Fire Emblem'')

See also
 M.U.G.E.N

Notes

References

External links
 Crossover games on Giant Bomb
 When Worlds Collide: Exploring Game Crossovers

 
Crossovers